The Magnolia Lane Plantation, also known as the Fortier Plantation, is a historic plantation located on the Mississippi River in Jefferson Parish, Louisiana along LA 541. 
The plantation was owned in 1784 by Edward Fortier, during the Spanish colonial period. After being purchased in 1867 the plantation changed its name.

The plantation house and a  area comprising several non contributing structures was added to the National Register of Historic Places on February 13, 1986.

The plantation home and property has been used for many major motion picture productions filmed in the New Orleans area.

See also
National Register of Historic Places listings in Jefferson Parish, Louisiana

References 

Houses on the National Register of Historic Places in Louisiana
Greek Revival houses in Louisiana
Federal architecture in Louisiana
Houses completed in 1784
Houses in Jefferson Parish, Louisiana
National Register of Historic Places in Jefferson Parish, Louisiana